Fred Antoine Provincial Park is a provincial park in British Columbia, Canada, located 25 kilometres northwest of Lillooet, British Columbia.  The park, which is 2,230 hectares in size, was established in 2010.

External links
Backgrounder
BC Geographical Names: Fred Antoine Park

Provincial parks of British Columbia
2010 establishments in British Columbia
Protected areas established in 2010